Cryptoclidia is a clade of plesiosaurs.

Cryptoclidia was named and defined as a node clade in 2010 by Hilary Ketchum and Roger Benson: the group consisting of the last common ancestor of Cryptoclidus eurymerus and Polycotylus latipinnis; and all its descendants.

The following cladogram follows an analysis by Benson & Druckenmiller (2014).

References

Plesiosaurs